Mauriciu Blank (1848 – November 22, 1929) was a Romanian banker, co-founder, alongside Iacob Marmorosch, of the Marmorosch Blank Bank.

Notes

1848 births
1929 deaths
People from Pitești
Romanian Sephardi Jews
Romanian bankers